Annabelle Huggins (born 1943) is a retired Filipino actress. In 1964 she starred alongside Jack Nicholson in Back Door to Hell, and later became famous when she was kidnapped by taxi driver Ruben Ablaza.

Early life 
Annabelle was born to an American-Filipino father and Filipino mother. She was later raised by her aunt and uncle along with her siblings, wherein her aunt treated her as her own child. In 1958 she dropped out of high school to work in a billiard hall where she met Ruben Ablaza.

Career 
She debuted in the movie Adonis Abril (1963) with Nestor De Villa, Back Door to Hell with Jack Nicholson (her Hollywood debut), and also Siyam na Buhay ni Martin Pusa (1964) with Joseph Estrada.

Kidnapping 
On October 23, 1962, 19-year-old Huggins reported that she was taken against her will to Hagonoy, Bulacan and defiled of her honor by Ruben Ablaza, a portly taxi driver, who plotted the abduction with two others, Lauro Ocampo and Jose “Totoy Pulis” Leoncio. The incident was repeated on March 22, 1963, and this time, Huggins was reportedly kidnapped from Makati and taken first to Caloocan and then to Bulacan, a more serious offense.

Trial 

When Ablaza was apprehended and tried in court, he contended that the two were in love, that she freely went with him and what he did “was the vogue of the time.” The most awaited part of the trial was when the principal witness, Huggins, testified before Fiscal Pascual Kliatchko and a curious courtroom crowd.

In 1969 Ablaza claimed that he and Annabelle were a couple. Ablaza and the two men were found guilty for kidnapping and rape, and were sentenced to death. While the two men were executed, Ablaza's death sentence was cancelled by then-sitting president Ferdinand Marcos twice and reduced to life imprisonment. He spent most of his life imprisoned in New Bilibid Prison until his release in the late 1990's.

Shortly after his release, Ablaza died of natural causes.

Portrayals 
Two movies twice portrayed her. In 1963 came Ang Mananaggol ni Ruben with Mario Montenegro as Abalaza and Lolita Rodriguez as Huggins. In 1995 Director Carlo J. Caparas made Annabelle Huggins Story - Ruben Ablaza Tragedy: Mea Culpa starting Cesar Montano as Ablaza  and Dawn Zulueta as Huggins. The real Ruben Ablaza appears as himself still serving his life sentence at the end of the film.

See also 
Maggie dela Riva

References

External links 
 

Filipino film actresses
Filipino people of American descent
1943 births
Living people